The Ash Meadows pebblesnail (Pyrgulopsis erythropoma) is a species of  freshwater snail with a gill and an operculum, aquatic gastropod mollusk in the family Hydrobiidae.

This species is endemic to the Point of Rocks spring complex, Ash Meadows, Nevada, United States.  Its natural habitat is springs. It is threatened by habitat loss.

The common name of this species is taken from the name of the Ash Meadows National Wildlife Refuge in Nevada.

Description
Its differentiated from other Pyrgulopsis in that its penial filament has an absent lobe and elongate filament with the penial ornament consisting of a large, superficial ventral gland. It is distinguished from closely similar P. pisteri by its more globose shell, blade-like penis, and absence of anterior capsule gland vestibule.

References

Pyrgulopsis
Gastropods described in 1899
Taxonomy articles created by Polbot